Ecotone (formerly Royal Wessanen) is a multinational food company with a focus on organic, founded in the Netherlands and headquartered in France since November 2020. It has operations in Europe and North America. Worldwide it had approx 2,000 employees at the end of 2011, a year in which it reported a revenue of €706 million. The company is owned by PAI Partners (62%) and Charles Jobson (38%), shares for the company were delisted.

History 
'Wessanen en Laan' was founded in 1765 in Wormerveer by Adriaan Wessanen and Dirk Laan to trade in ‘Mustard, Canary and other seeds’. The company flourished as new uses were found for all sorts of seeds. It was helped by the contemporary popularity for keeping caged birds, particularly canaries.
At the beginning of the 19th century, the landscape around the Zaan river was dominated by merchants’ houses, their warehouses and, most distinctively, their windmills. In the pre-industrial age, the windmills functioned as sophisticated processing plants, using wind power to crush, grind and mix all manner of ingredients.
Wessanen was by the start of the 20th century a large company, and following the award of royal warrants it was now known as NV Wessanen Koninklijke Fabrieken (royal factories). With a diversified global sales market, it was able to survive war, tariff barriers and the demise of colonialism. But it was still a typically Dutch company, with production facilities on the Zaan River.

Activities 
Wessanen works with organic or natural food

In Europe Wessanen is, next to the Netherlands (Wessanen Benelux, Natudis, Foodprints, Kroon Biologische Verswaren), active in Belgium (Hagor-Bioservice), Germany (Allos Hof-Manufaktur GmbH, Allos GmbH, Allos Schwarzwald GmbH), France (Bjorg Bonneterre et Compagnie), the United Kingdom (Kallo Foods, Clipper tea) and Italy (Bio Slym, Abafoods).

Wessanen decided to leave the North American market. Its Tree of Life unit, part of the firm since 1985, was sold to Chicago-based Kehe Food Distributors for $190 million in early 2010. It concluded the €16.7 million sale of its bread products subsidiary Panos in December 2010 and sold American Beverage Corporation to Harvest Hill Beverage Co. in 2015.

Brands 
Some of Wessanen's brands include:
 Allos
 Bjorg
 Bonneterre
 Clipper tea
 Kallø
 Tartex
 Whole Earth
 Zonnatura

Board of directors

Executive board 
 Christophe Barnouin, CEO
 Ronald Merckx, CFO

Supervisory board 
 Frank van Oers, Chairman
 Rudy Kluiber
 Ivonne Rietjens 
 Patrick Mispolet

References

External links 

Food and drink companies of the Netherlands
Manufacturing companies based in Amsterdam
Food and drink companies established in 1765
Dutch brands
Certified B Corporations in the Food & Beverage Industry
PAI Partners companies